Idlewild is an unincorporated community in Stoddard County, in the U.S. state of Missouri.

Idlewild was laid out in 1910 when the railroad was extended to that point.

References

Unincorporated communities in Stoddard County, Missouri
Unincorporated communities in Missouri
1910 establishments in Missouri